Pachole  is a village in the administrative district of Gmina Dębowa Kłoda, within Parczew County, Lublin Voivodeship, in eastern Poland.

References

Pachole is also a sweet flat cookie from San Luis Potosí, Mexico

Pachole